17th Congress may refer to:

 17th Congress of the All-Union Communist Party (Bolsheviks) (1934)
 17th Congress of the Philippines (2016–2019)
 17th National Congress of the Chinese Communist Party (2007)
 17th National Congress of the Kuomintang (2005)
 17th United States Congress (1821–1823)